Events from the year 1725 in Great Britain.

Incumbents
 Monarch – George I
 Prime Minister – Robert Walpole (Whig)
 Parliament – 6th

Events
 2 March – in London, a night watchman finds a severed head by the Thames; it is later recognized to be that of the husband of Catherine Hayes. She and an accomplice are later executed.
 12 May – the Black Watch is raised as a military company as part of the pacification of the Scottish Highlands under General George Wade.
 18 May – the Order of the Bath is founded by King George I.
 24 May – Jonathan Wild, fraudulent "Thief Taker General", is hanged in Tyburn, for actually aiding criminals.
 3 September – Treaty of Hanover signed between Great Britain, France and Prussia.
 20 November – the horse-post from Edinburgh to London vanishes after passing through Berwick-upon-Tweed; horse and rider are thought to have perished on tidal sands near Lindisfarne.

Undated
 A fire in Wapping, England destroys 70 houses.
 Alexander Pope produces an English language translation of Homer's Odyssey.

Births
 4 February – Dru Drury, entomologist (died 1804)
 6 March – Henry Benedict Stuart, cardinal and Jacobite claimant to the British throne (born, and died 1807, in Italy)
 28 March – Andrew Kippis, non-conformist clergyman and biographer (died 1795)
 25 April – Augustus Keppel, 1st Viscount Keppel, admiral (died 1786)
 23 May – Robert Bakewell, agriculturalist (died 1795)
 1 July – Rhoda Delaval, portrait painter (died 1757)
 24 July – John Newton, cleric and hymnist (died 1807)
 29 August – Charles Townshend, politician (died 1767)
 29 September – Robert Clive, 1st Baron Clive, general and statesman (died 1774)
 17 October – John Wilkes, politician and journalist (died 1797)
 Paul Sandby, cartographer and painter (died 1809)

Deaths
 8 April – John Wise, clergyman (born 1652)
 24 May – Jonathan Wild, criminal (born 1682)

See also

References

 
Years in Great Britain